The State Register of Heritage Places is maintained by the Heritage Council of Western Australia. , 179 places are heritage-listed in the Shire of Peppermint Grove, of which seven are on the State Register of Heritage Places.

List
The Western Australian State Register of Heritage Places, lists the following seven state registered places within the Shire of Peppermint Grove:

References

Peppermint